The 1984 Philippine Basketball Association (PBA) All-Filipino Conference was the first conference of the 1984 PBA season. It started on March 25 and ended on July 17, 1984.

Format
The following format will be observed for the duration of the conference:
 Double-round eliminations; 14 games per team; Teams are then seeded by basis on win–loss records.
 The two teams at the bottom of the standings after the elimination round will be eliminated. The top two teams will advance outright to the semifinals. 
 The next four teams will qualify in a single round robin quarterfinals. Results from the elimination round will be carried over. The top two teams will advance to the semifinals.
 Semifinals will be a double round robin affair with the four remaining teams.  The top two teams in the semifinals advance to the best-of-seven finals. The last two teams dispute the third-place trophy in a best-of-seven series.

Elimination round

Semifinal berth playoff

Quarterfinals

Semifinals

Third place playoffs

Finals

References

PBA Philippine Cup
All-Filipino Conference 1